The 1976 Fresno State Bulldogs football team represented California State University, Fresno as a member of the Pacific Coast Athletic Association (PCAA) during the 1976 NCAA Division I football season. Led by first-year head coach Jim Sweeney, Fresno State compiled an overall record of 5–6 with a mark of 3–1 in conference play, placing second in the PCAA. The Bulldogs played their home games at Ratcliffe Stadium on the campus of Fresno City College in Fresno, California.

While Fresno State lost its opener on the road to Southwestern Louisiana, the game was subsequently forfeited due to the use of ineligible players. The won-loss record is not adjusted.

An experienced head coach, Sweeney was hired in December 1975, shortly after his resignation from Washington State University. He had led the Cougars of the Pac-8 Conference for eight seasons, preceded by five at Montana State in the Big Sky Conference.

Schedule

References

Fresno State
Fresno State Bulldogs football seasons
Fresno State Bulldogs football